Over My Heart is the seventh and final studio album by American singer Laura Branigan. Released in August 1993, it was Branigan's most personal album and saw her again try her hand at producing, alongside successful producer Phil Ramone. While the Gloria Estefan-penned "Love Your Girl" was aimed for the clubs that made her famous, the album was ballad-heavy, including the opener "How Can I Help You To Say Goodbye"; the Spanish-language "Mujer Contra Mujer"; "Mangwane (The Wedding Song)" (taught to her by her friend Stevie Godson, who was also the executive producer on the track), sung in Sotho, a South African language, and recorded there with the Mmabana Children's Choir; and several of her own compositions, "Didn't We Almost Win It All" and "Over You".

Critical reception
Chuck Eddy from Entertainment Weekly wrote, "Branigan’s 1982 hit, ”Gloria”, took disco to operatic extremes, and her ’84 ”Self Control” was basically Joy Division’s Goth-punk classic, ”She’s Lost Control”, made more lurid. Nowadays, Branigan is beating Celine Dion at Dion’s own game, dancing between a loudly sung boom and a lonely housewife gloom. On Over My Heart, she climbs out on a new limb, belting out lyrics in Spanish and a South African dialect. But she’s still rending hearts, especially when she remembers the day her family moved away from her best friend in a ’59 station wagon."

"Didn't We Almost Win It All"
"Didn't We Almost Win It All" was released as the first single from the album. Larry Flick from Billboard described the song as "a sweeping power-ballad" from Branigan's "delicious (but sadly underrated) Over My Heart album." He added, "Branigan's distinct, crystal-clear voice is warmly familiar, running through a gamut of theatrical emotions as only she can. The arrangement is packed with grandiose piano rushes, nimble guitar riffs, and pounds of faux-strings. Like sinfully tasty candy for the brain."

Track listing

Personnel
Laura Branigan - vocals, background vocals
Beatrice Akuoko, Dela Amuzu, Gloria Ayee, Manuela Ayee, John:Carol Bukenya, Ann Davis, Rena Davis, Slaveca Gavrilovic, Khumo Khaole, Malebogo Felicity Mabille, Bruce Molema, Mpho Pharasi, Mokgoberg Refilwe Phirwa, Thenjiwe Roda, Refilwe Roselinda Moiloa, Golda Schultz, Barbara Sentongo, Sphumele Sibeko, Khanyisa Thakula - children's chorus
Jacob Bantsejang, Gladys Kgadiete, Bushy Monakwane, Grace Msumbu, Patricia Tong, Ingrid Tubo - vocals
John Benjamin Bukrnya, Christina Luboyera, Neo Carol Matte, Valentine Kgothatso Motlhabi - choir
Billy Branigan, Jill Dell'Abate, Rory Dodd, Joy Francis, Karen Kamon, Curtis King, Charles Mangold - backing vocals
Tony Beard, Kevin Wells - drums
Brian Bec Var, Jeff Jacobs, Clay Ostwald, Eric Rehl, Peter "Ski" Schwartz, Dave "Squiggy" Biglan - keyboards
Billy Branigan, Jorge Casas, Bushy Monakwane - bass guitar
Billy Branigan, Charlton Pettus, David Spinozza - acoustic guitar
John McCurry - electric guitar 
Dave Greenfield, Jeff Greenfield, Steve Greenfield - alto saxophone
Bashiri Johnson - percussion
Lenny Pickett - tenor saxophone

Production
Producers: Laura Branigan, Billy Branigan, Jorge Casas, Clay Ostwald, Phil Ramone, Stevie Godson
Engineers: Charles Dye, Danny Grigsby, Lolly Grodner, Richard Mitchell, Clay Ostwald
Assistant engineer: Louis Alfred III, Jim Caruana, Sean Chambers, Tom Fritze, Alister Glyn, Andy Grassi, Ron London, Jennifer Monnar, Michael Thompson
Mixing: Danny Grigsby, Lolly Grodner, Jay Healy, Andy Smith
Mixing Assistant: Andy Smith
Mastering: Greg Calbi
Programming: Jorge Casas, Roy McDonald, Clay Ostwald
Project coordinator: Jill Dell'Abate
Sampling: Roy McDonald
Arranger: Laura Branigan, Billy Branigan, Jorge Casas, Jeff Jacobs, Clay Ostwald, Phil Ramone, Eric Rehl, Peter "Ski" Schwartz
Computers: Roy McDonald

Charts

References

Laura Branigan albums
1993 albums
Albums produced by Phil Ramone
Atlantic Records albums